, also known as IBC, is a Japanese television and radio station affiliated with the Japan News Network (JNN). Their headquarters are located in Morioka, Iwate Prefecture.

Network 
 TV: Japan News Network (JNN)
 RADIO: Japan Radio Network (JRN), National Radio Network (NRN)

Stations

Analog TV
 Morioka (Main Station) JODF-TV 6ch (ceased broadcasting on March 31, 2012)

Digital TV(ID:6) 
 Morioka (Main Station) JODF-DTV 16ch

RADIO 
 Morioka (Main Station) JODF 684 kHz; 90.6 MHz FM

Rival Stations 
Television Iwate (TVI)
Iwate Menkoi Television (MIT)
Iwate Asahi Television (IAT)

External links
 Iwate Broadcasting Company

Japan News Network
Television stations in Japan
Radio in Japan
Mass media in Morioka, Iwate
Television channels and stations established in 1959